Helle or Hella is a village in Sunnfjord Municipality in Vestland county, Norway. The population of Helle (2001) was 133.

References

Villages in Vestland
Sunnfjord